Risedale is an area and ward of Barrow-in-Furness, Cumbria, England. It is bordered by Barrow town centre, Parkside, Newbarns and Roose and had a population of 5,663 in 2001,increasing to 6,294 at the 2011 Census.

The ward itself will be combined with Roosecote ward in April 2023 following formation of the new Westmorland and Furness Local Authority.

Risedale is a fairly deprived district, with figures for unemployment being higher than Barrow and national average. Council housing makes up much of the southern area of the ward (in the form of Broadway, Gateway, Longway and Westway).

References

Risedale